Into the Light is the second studio solo album released by American singer Gloria Estefan, but is the 14th overall, released on January 25, 1991, by Epic Records. The album reached number five on the US Billboard 200, becoming her most successful album on the chart.

Background
Into the Light followed her successful 1989 album Cuts Both Ways, and the near-tragic accident Estefan experienced during the "Get on Your Feet Tour". The theme of the title track was bouncing back from the darkness of disaster. The album received commercial success, and has sold 1.8 million copies in United States according to Nielsen Soundscan.

Track listing

Personnel 
Gloria Estefan – vocal, background vocals
Jon Secada, Betty Wright, Jeannete Wright, Carl Ramsey, Anita Faye Green, Rod Wilson, Clovette Hilton, Namphuyo Aisha McCray – background vocals
Betty Wright – background vocals
Angelo Morris – piano
Clay Ostwald – piano, keyboards
Brian Monroney, John De Faria, Scott Shapiro – guitar
Jorge Casas – bass guitar
Robert Rodriguez, Tom McWilliams – drums
Randy Barlow, Arturo Sandoval – trumpet
Teddy Mulet – trombone
Mike Scaglione – alto saxophone
Emilio Estefan Jr. – congas
Rafael Padilla – percussion, shaker
Juan Marquez – twelve-string guitar

Production 
Emilio Estefan Jr. – producer, arranger
Jorge Casas – producer, arranger
Clay Ostwald – producer, arranger
Gloria Estefan – arranger
John Haag – arranger
Tom McWilliams – arranger
Scott Shapiro – arranger
Jon Secada – arranger
Phil Ramone – arranger, additional mixing
Keith Cohen – arranger, additional mixing
Guy Roche – arranger
Randy Barlow – arranger
Patrice Levinsohn – engineer
Eric Schilling – engineer, mixing
Doug Grover – assistant engineer
Charles Dye – assistant engineer
Pablo Flores – additional mixing
Mike Couzzi – additional mixing
Keith Cohen – additional mixing
Bob Ludwig – mastering at Masterdisk at New York.

Design 
Nancy Donald – art direction
Mary Maurer – art direction
Alberto Tolot – photography
Eric Bernard – hair and makeup

Charts

Weekly charts

Year-end charts

Certifications

Release history

References

External links

1991 albums
Gloria Estefan albums
Concept albums
Epic Records albums
Albums produced by Emilio Estefan